Bhante Sujato, known as Ajahn Sujato or Bhikkhu Sujato (born Anthony Best), is an Australian Theravada Buddhist monk ordained into the Thai forest lineage of Ajahn Chah.

Life

A former musician with the post punk Alternative rock Australian band Martha's Vineyard, who had toured with, amongst others, Simply Red, INXS, Eurythmics, and proto-punk garage band The Saints before disbanding in 1990, Sujato became a monk in 1994 in the ascetic Forest Tradition of Ajahn Chah, a religious order which encourages a life of contemplation and meditation. He took Upasampadā higher ordination in Thailand and lived there for years before returning to Australia. He spent several years at Bodhinyana Monastery in Western Australia before going on to found Santi Forest Monastery in 2003 where he served as the abbot. Following Bhante Sujato's wishes, Santi became a Bhikkhunī ( Buddhist nun's ) monastery Vihara in 2012, and he returned to live in Bodhinyana.

Monastic work 

In 2005, Bhante Sujato co-founded the Buddhist website SuttaCentral along with Rod Bucknell and John Kelly, to provide access to early Buddhist texts in their original language and make translations available in modern languages. After being unable to secure copyright-free digital translations of the Pali Canon for SuttaCentral, Bhante Sujato moved to the island of Chimei, off the coast of Taiwan, to undertake the task of creating English translations of the four Nikāyas, living there from 2015 to 2018. These translations have since been published on SuttaCentral, and as free edition books.

In 2019, Bhante Sujato moved to Sydney to establish Lokanta Vihara (the Monastery at the End of the World) with his long term student, Bhante Akaliko, to explore what it means to follow the Buddha’s teachings in an era of climate change, globalised consumerism, and political turmoil. He is also involved with Engaged Buddhism. Sujato aligns himself with anarcho-pacifism, which he explains as being compatible with Buddhist lay and renunciant life, as well as being in accord with the monastic vinaya.

Bhikkuni 

Bhante Sujato along with his teacher Ajahn Brahm were involved with Re-establishing Bhikkhuni Ordination in the Forest sangha of Ajahn Chah. Sujato along with other scholars such as Brahm and Bhikkhu Analayo had come to the conclusion that there was no valid reason the extinct bhikkhuni order couldn't be re-established. The ordination ceremony led to Brahm's expulsion from the Thai Forest Lineage of Ajahn Chah. Bhante Sujato however, was not deterred or intimidated by such a response, and, remaining faithful to his convictions that there was no reason the Bhikkhunī order should not be revived, went on to successfully found Santi Forest Monastery, and following Bhante Sujato's wishes, Santi has since flourished as a Bhikkhunī (Buddhist nun) monastery Vihara since 2012.

Bibliography

References

External links

Sujato's Blog
Dhamma talks by Ajahn Sujato
Lokanta Vihara website

1966 births
Australian alternative rock musicians
Australian rock singers
Australian rock guitarists
Converts to Buddhism
Theravada Buddhist monks
Theravada Buddhism writers
Engaged Buddhists
Living people